Khin Maung Kyi (10 September 1926 – 6 September 2013) was a prominent Burmese economist and scholar. He also served as a government consultant to several of Burma's ministries.

Early life and education

Khin Maung Kyi was born in Phyu, a small town in central Burma. He earned a bachelor's degree in commerce at the University of Rangoon. Thereafter, he received a scholarship to attend Harvard University, where he earned a master's degree in business administration. He went on to earn a Doctorate degree in management at Cornell University.

Career

From 1954 to 1978, he worked as a lecturer and professor at the University of Rangoon’s Institute of Economics. In 1978, Khin Maung Kyi left the country. He accepted a teaching post in Malaysia to teach as a professor of agribusiness at Universiti Pertanian Malaysia. He later became an Associate professor in the School of Management(National University of Singapore) in 1979 a position he held until 1988. In 1983, he founded the Asia Pacific Journal of Management, which became the National University of Singapore's School of Management's (now NUS Business School) flagship journal. From 1983 to September 1988, he served as the journal's first editor-in-chief. In 1991, he became a senior fellow at National University of Singapore’s Department of Business Policy.

Death
Khin Maung Kyi, died on 6 September 2013, four days before his 87th birthday. Although he suffered from various illnesses in his remaining years, his cause of death was attributed to complications from a lung infection. He is survived by his wife and four children.

Notable works
Economic Development of Burma: A Vision and a Strategy (2000)

References

1926 births
2013 deaths
Burmese economists
University of Yangon alumni
Harvard Business School alumni
Samuel Curtis Johnson Graduate School of Management alumni
Academic staff of the National University of Singapore
People from Mandalay Region